The 1960 France rugby union tour of South America was a series of rugby union matches played by the France national team in Argentina, Uruguay and Chile.

France played a series of matches in Argentina (including three tests v the national team) and also two games in Chile and Uruguay, although those are not considered tests by the French Federation.

Touring party
 President: René Crabos
 Coach: Marcel Laurent
 Referee: Bernard Marie
 Press Agent: Denis Lalanne

Players 

 Michel Vannier
 Roger Brethes
 Jean Dupuy
 Henri Rancoule
 Guy Boniface
 Arnaud Marquesuzaa
 Jean Othats
 Pierre Dizabo
 Michel Lacome
 Roger Martine
 Pierre Danos
 Pierre Lacroix
 François Moncla
 Michel Crauste
 Michel Celaya
 Sylvain Meyer
 Jean Carrere
 Roland Crancele
 Herve Larrue
 Jean Pierre Saux
 Amedee Domenech
 Alfred Roques
 Raoul Barriere
 Jean de Gregorio
 Jacques Rollet

Match details 
Complete list of matches played by France in South America:

First test

Second test

Third test 

Uruguay: L.Vásquez; Agustín Canessa, B. Fontana, Penco, E. Llovet; D. Moor-Davie, R. Hoober; H. Pugh, G. Sebasti, J. Shaw; Alvaro Canessa, H. Bergmann; G. Dupont, R. Vivo, A. Hughes 
France: M. Vannier; J. Othats, M. Lacome, R. Martine, H. Rancoule; R. Brethes, P. Dizabo; M. Crauste, R. Crancée, F. Monclá (cap.); S. Meyer, J. Saux; A. Domenech, J. de Gregorio, A. Roques

Notes

References 

France tour
Rugby union tours of Argentina
Rugby union tours of Uruguay
France national rugby union team tours
Argentina–France sports relations
France–Uruguay relations
rugby
1960–61 in French rugby union
1960 in Uruguayan sport
1960 in Chilean sport